Codigoro is a comune (municipality) in the Province of Ferrara in the Italian region Emilia-Romagna, located about  northeast of Bologna and about  east of Ferrara.

Main sights
Abbey of Pomposa (9th century)
Bishop's Palace, restored in Venetian style in 1732
Finance Tower (18th century)
Memorial to World War I Soldier, by Codigoro sculptor Mario Sarto

References

External links
 Official website

Cities and towns in Emilia-Romagna